Seo Hyo-rim (born January 6, 1985) is a South Korean actress.

Filmography

Television series

Film

Variety show

Music video

Awards and nominations

References

External links

Living people
1985 births
South Korean television actresses
South Korean film actresses
South Korean female models